VAS Latvijas Pasts is the main state-owned postal service provider in Latvia headquartered in Riga. It was founded on 2 January 1992, following shortly after the restoration of independence of the country.

History 
Latvia Post was founded on 2 January 1992 as a state-owned company, prior to which multiple postal companies had already existed in the territory. On 1 November 2004, Latvia Post was re-registered simply as a state joint-stock company instead of having the status of a nonprofit organization state stock company.

In 2014, Latvia Post partook in the transition from lats to euro that took place in the whole country by providing currency exchange services following the official exchange rate of 1.00 LVL for 1.42 EUR for 3 months in 302 post offices where it was deemed necessary due to local banking service availability issues.

See also 
 Postage stamps and postal history of Latvia
 List of people on stamps of Latvia

References 

Communications in Latvia
Companies based in Riga
Postal organizations
Government-owned companies
1992 establishments in Latvia